Diastata is a genus of flies, and are in the family Diastatidae.

Species
D. adusta Meigen, 1830 
D. boreonigra Chandler, 1987 
D. cervinala Chandler, 1987 
D. costata Meigen, 1830 
D. flavicosta Chandler, 1987 
D. fuscula (Fallén, 1823) 
D. inornata Loew, 1864
D. nebulosa (Fallén, 1823) 
D. ornata Meigen, 1830 
D. vagans Loew, 1864

References

Diastatidae
Articles containing video clips
Ephydroidea genera